Haimanti, is an Indian female given name. It is the feminine derivative of Hemanta, one of the six Indian ecological seasons—Ritu—in northern half of Indian subcontinent, which runs in early winter approximately from November to December. The male version of the name is Hemant.

People named Haimanti include:
Haimanti Rakshit Das, Bangladeshi singer
Haimanti Sukla, Indian singer

Indian feminine given names